Huntoon is a surname. Notable people with the surname include:

Carolyn Huntoon (born 1940), American scientist and first female Director of the Johnson Space Center
David H. Huntoon (born 1951), United States Army general
Louis Doremus Huntoon (1869–1937), American mining engineer
George William Huntoon IV (born 1992) United States Navy, elevator engineer

See also
Huntoon Mountains, a mountain range in Mineral County, Nevada, United States